SS Warrimoo was a passenger and refrigerated cargo liner that was launched in 1892 in England for Australian owners, was later owned by two of New Zealand's foremost shipping companies, and finally belonged to a Singaporean company.

Warrimoo was the subject of a claim that she crossed the intersection of the International Date Line and the Equator precisely at the turn of the year from 1899 to 1900.

Warrimoo was a troop ship in the First World War. In 1918 the  collided with Warrimoo in the Mediterranean. In the collision some of Catapultes depth charges broke loose and fell into the sea, where they detonated and sank both ships.

Building
Swan, Hunter built Warrimoo at Wallsend on the River Tyne, launching her on 28 May 1892 and completing her that July. Swan, Hunter also built a sister ship, which was launched on 25 July and completed in October.

Service
James Huddart ordered Warrimoo and Miowera for his New Zealand and Australian Steam Ship Company to run a Trans-Tasman service between New Zealand and Australia. However, Warrimoos maiden voyage was a cruise to the fjords of Norway before she was delivered to the Southern Hemisphere.

In 1893 Huddart created the Canadian-Australian Steam Ship Company to operate a liner service between Australia and Vancouver, British Columbia, and he transferred Warrimoo and Miowera to this new service.

In 1897 the New Zealand Shipping Company bought both Warrimoo and Miowera. In 1901 the Union Steamship Company of New Zealand, commonly called simply the "Union Company", bought Warrimoo.

Warrimoo was a troop ship in the First World War. In February 1915 she took the Māori Pioneer Battalion overseas as part of the New Zealand Expeditionary Force.

In 1916 Khiam Yik & Co Ltd of Singapore, a company controlled by Tan Kah Kee, bought Warrimoo. She continued to carry troops.

In May 1918 Warrimoo was part of a convoy carrying troops from Bizerte (Tunisia) to Marseille (France). The destroyer Catapulte collided with her, some of Catapultes depth charges broke loose, fell into the sea and detonated, sinking both ships. 58 of Catapultes crew and one person aboard Warrimoo were killed.

International Date Line claim
In January 1900 The Sydney Morning Herald reported that Warrimoo crossed the Equator on 30 December 1899.

However, it was later claimed that Warrimoo reached the intersection of the International Date Line and the Equator at midnight on 31 December 1899. This would have placed her bow in the Southern Hemisphere in summer on 1 January 1900, her stern in the Northern Hemisphere in winter on 31 December 1899. She would therefore have been simultaneously in two different seasons (winter and summer), in two different hemispheres, on two different days, in two different months, in two different years, in two different decades, in two different centuries. (Which would of course mean that the writer thought a century started in the year 0 or 1900, where in fact it started in 1901.)

The story was still in popular print circulation in 1942,  was popularized by an article in the magazine Ships and the Sea in 1953, and was in online circulation on social media .  However, the navigational technology of the time was not accurate enough to have fixed her position so precisely. Whether Warrimoo ever achieved the feat claimed cannot be verified.

This story makes the common claim that the new century started in the year 1900.

References

External links

1892 ships
Maritime incidents in 1918
Passenger ships of New Zealand
Ships of the New Zealand Shipping Company
Ships of the Union Steam Ship Company
Passenger ships of the United Kingdom
Ships built by Swan Hunter
Ships sunk in collisions
Steamships of New Zealand
Steamships of the United Kingdom
World War I ships of New Zealand
World War I shipwrecks in the Mediterranean Sea